Roots and Wings is the second and final studio album released by the American country music artist James Bonamy. It was released June 24, 1997, on Epic Records Nashville. The single "The Swing" was a number 31 on the Billboard country charts in 1997. "Naked to the Pain" and "Little Blue Dot" were also released as singles, although neither reached the Top 40. The title song was previously recorded by Doug Supernaw on his 1995 album You Still Got Me.

Critical reception
Thom Owens of Allmusic rated the album three stars out of five, calling the album's content "uneven" but saying that Bonamy "is singing better than ever". Larry Stephens of Country Standard Time was less favorable, saying that Bonamy "sounds like a pop singer trying to do country". He thought that "Daddy Never Had a Chance in Hell" was the best-written song, and that the title track was "touching". Giving it 3 out of 5 stars, David Simons of New Country wrote that "One has to wade through the occasionally predictable slices of hokum[…]to get to the good stuff, but there's enough of that to successfully get Bonamy and his listeners to the end of this record."

Track listing

Personnel
James Bonamy – lead vocals
Joe Chemay – bass guitar
Larry Franklin – fiddle
Paul Franklin – pedal steel guitar
John Hobbs – keyboards, strings
Michael Jones – background vocals
Paul Leim – drums, percussion
Liana Manis – background vocals
Terry McMillan – harmonica, percussion
Blue Miller – electric guitar, background vocals
Brent Rowan – electric guitar
Billy Joe Walker, Jr. – acoustic guitar
Biff Watson – acoustic guitar, mandolin
Curtis Young – background vocals

Chart performance

References

[ Roots and Wings] at Allmusic

1997 albums
James Bonamy albums
Epic Records albums
Albums produced by Doug Johnson (record producer)